Peter Francis Woodruff (April 2, 1874 – April 21, 1918) was a professional baseball player. He played part of the 1899 season in Major League Baseball for the New York Giants, primarily as a right fielder.

References

External links

Major League Baseball right fielders
New York Giants (NL) players
Norfolk Clam Eaters players
Dallas Steers players
Martinsburg Patriots players
Petersburg Farmers players
Hampton Clamdiggers players
Richmond Bluebirds players
Philadelphia Athletics (minor league) players
Reading Actives players
Bridgeport Orators players
New London Whalers players
Norwich Witches players
Holyoke Paperweights players
Minor league baseball managers
Baseball players from Baltimore
19th-century baseball players
1874 births
1918 deaths